The Military Service Medal was a military decoration of South Vietnam. Established in 1964, the medal recognized the completion of a prescribed service time, the displayment of good conduct, and the high working spirit in service.

The Military Service Medal has five different grades and some of them contains small leaf device, starting from the fourth ranks and up.

See also
Military awards and decorations of South Vietnam

References

Military awards and decorations of Vietnam
Awards established in 1964